Skene is a surname of Scottish origin. Notable people with the surname include:

 Alan Skene (1932–2001), South African rugby footballer
 Alexander Skene (1837–1900), Scottish gynaecologist
 Clyde Skene (1884–1945), Scottish footballer
 Felicia Skene (1821–1899), Scottish author
 Provost Skene (Sir George Skene), Provost of Aberdeen, 1676–85
 George Skene (1749–1825), soldier and politician
 James Skene (1775–1864), Scottish lawyer and friend of Sir Walter Scott
 James Henry Skene (1812–1886), author, traveller and British Consul at Aleppo
 John Skene (New Jersey official), third deputy governor of West Jersey, 1684–92
 John Skene, Lord Curriehill (c.1543–1617), Scottish prosecutor, ambassador, and judge.
 Leslie Skene (1882–1959), Scottish footballer (List of Scotland international footballers (1–4 caps))
 Lilias Skene (1627–1697), Scottish Quaker preacher, prophet and poet
 Philip Skene (1725–1810), British Army officer and New York landowner
 Robert Skene (British Army officer) (1719–1787), British Army officer and MP
 Robert Skene (polo player) (1914–1997), American polo player
 Robert Skene (cricketer) (1908–1988), English cricketer
 William Forbes Skene (born 1809), Scottish historian and antiquary

References

Surnames of Scottish origin